Huang Beijia (born 1955) is a Chinese writer of fiction for adults and younger readers.

Biography
Huang Beijia was born in 1955, in Rugao, Jiangsu Province, China. She started writing in 1972 and her first works were published in 1973, focusing on the lives and emotions of intellectuals, at university and in society. Many of her earlier works feature female students, navigating emotional relationships, and attitudes towards Chinese masculinity. Representative works include Carnival Every Night, Midnight Cocktail and Century Romance. She has subsequently become a renowned author for children and younger readers, and was China's nominated author for the 2020 Hans Christian Andersen Award.

Huang graduated from the Chinese Literature department, Peking University. She holds a post of Foreign Affairs Office of Jiangsu Province. She is also Director and Vice-chairman of the Writers Association of Jiangsu Province. She has been a member of the Chinese Writers Association since 1984.

See also

 Shi, Jinyu,  “After 40, Memory Is Still Engraved on My Heart”, translated by Jesse Field. Chinese Arts and Letters 1, 2 (2014): 75-88.
 Xiao, Hua and Wang Zheng, “One Fabulous Family: On the Novels of Huang Beijia", translated by Jesse Field. Chinese Arts and Letters 1, 2 (2014): 55-74.
 Li Meng, "Intellectual men and women in the 1980s fiction of Huang Beijia 黄蓓佳", East Asian History 41 (2017). http://www.eastasianhistory.org/41/li-meng

References

External links
 Huang Beijia on Chinese-shortstories.com
Huang Beijia, author of the month, Leeds Centre for News Chinese Writing, Dec 2019
 Extended Reading
 Voice reading
 Today I am the Flag Raiser reading

1955 births
Living people
Writers from Nantong
Chinese dramatists and playwrights
Chinese women novelists
Chinese children's writers
Chinese women children's writers
People's Republic of China novelists